Şorsulu (also, Shorsuli, Shorsulu, and Shorsuly) is a village and municipality in the Salyan Rayon of Azerbaijan.  It has a population of 3,004.

References 

Populated places in Salyan District (Azerbaijan)